The canton of Ustaritz-Vallées de Nive et Nivelle (before 2015: canton of Ustaritz) is a canton of France, in the Pyrénées-Atlantiques department. Its chief town is Ustaritz.

Composition 
At the French canton reorganisation which came into effect in March 2015, the canton was renamed and received the following 9 communes:
 
Ahetze 
Ainhoa
Arbonne
Arcangues
Ascain
Bassussarry
Saint-Pée-sur-Nivelle
Sare
Ustaritz

History 
In 1790, Saint-Pée-sur-Nivelle was the chief town of a canton composed of the communes of Ahetze and Saint-Pée-sur-Nivelle, and part of the district of Ustaritz. At the time, the canton of Ustaritz consisted of the communes of Arbonne, Arcangues, Jatxou, Ustaritz and Villefranque. Before 2015, the canton of Ustaritz consisted of the communes Ahetze, Arbonne, Arcangues, Bassussarry, Halsou, Jatxou, Larressore, Saint-Pée-sur-Nivelle and Ustaritz.

See also 
 Cantons of the Pyrénées-Atlantiques department

References 

Ustaritz-Vallees de Nive et Nivelle